Jean-Marc Gilbert Mormeck (born 3 June 1972) is a French former professional boxer who competed from 1995 to 2014. He is a two-time unified world cruiserweight champion, having held the WBA, WBC and  The Ring world titles twice between 2005 and 2007. He was the first boxer to hold unified cruiserweight title since Evander Holyfield in 1988, and the first fighter to hold The Ring cruiserweight title since Carlos De León in 1987. He was ranked by BoxRec as the world's top 10 cruiserweight from 2001 to 2005 and in 2007, and was ranked No.1 in 2003 and 2004. Mormeck also challenged for the unified world heavyweight title in 2012.

Early life
Mormeck was born in Pointe-à-Pitre, Guadeloupe as an only child to Fulbert and Sonia Mormeck. When he was 6, he and his family moved to Paris, France, where he still lives. Mormeck engaged himself in football and Muay Thai as an amateur. After watching some boxing matches on television, he became inspired to excel in it.

Professional career

1990–1998: early career
He fought as an amateur in 1990 and turned professional in 1995. Early in his career, Mormeck lost 2 minor four-round bouts on points but kept winning for years afterwards. On 10 November 1998, Mormeck won the French light heavyweight title with a unanimous decision win over Alain Simon. He defended that title three times before relinquishing it.

2002–2006: first world title and unification bouts

Later, Mormeck captured the WBA cruiserweight title by a 9th-round technical knockout win over Virgil Hill on 23 February 2002. Following three defenses with wins over Dale Brown, Alexander Gurov and Virgil Hill again, he added the WBC cruiserweight crown to his collection on 2 April 2005, by way of unanimous decision over Wayne Braithwaite.

However, Mormeck lost his WBA and WBC cruiserweight titles to O'Neil Bell after being knocked out in the 10th round. This bout, on 7 January 2006, was for the undisputed (WBA/WBC/IBF) cruiserweight championship.

2007: regaining cruiserweight titles
In their rematch, Mormeck regained the WBA and WBC titles back from Bell (Bell lost the IBF title over a dispute from the organization) by unanimous decision on 17 March 2007.

In the first defense of his second title reign, Mormeck lost his WBA, WBC and lineal cruiserweight titles as he was bested by mandatory challenger and knockout specialist David Haye on 10 November 2007. Mormeck was dropped heavily in the 7th round after being hit by a strong right from Haye. Although Mormeck rose up just in time, the referee realized that he was dazed and in no condition to go on, which caused the contest to be stopped and Haye winning the fight by knockout.

2009–2010: heavyweight
On 17 December 2009, Mormeck made his return to the ring after a two-year layoff, fighting for the first time as a heavyweight, against Vinny Maddalone. He outpointed the veteran heavyweight over 8 rounds.

Mormeck fought Uzbek heavyweight and WBA#7 Timur Ibragimov (30-3-1, 16 KO) on 2 December 2010, at Halle Carpentier, Paris.
Mormeck started slowly but dominated the middle rounds to win a split decision (116-112, 116-111, 113-115).

2012: Mormeck vs. Klitschko
In October 2011, Mormeck was signed to fight unified Heavyweight Champion Wladimir Klitschko on 10 December 2011 at Esprit Arena, Düsseldorf, Germany  until Klitschko pulled out after having a kidney stone removed on 2 December 2011. The fight was postponed to 3 March 2012. In this fight, Mormeck attempted to be only the third cruiserweight champion to win a world title at Heavyweight, after Evander Holyfield and David Haye. However, he was defeated by fourth round KO.

Return to cruiserweight and retirement
Following another extended layoff, Mormeck returned to the ring in June 2014 against Tamas Lodi of Hungary. Despite his early stoppage win, Mormeck openly expressed weariness for the fight game following the match, calling for a quick title shot before he could put an end to his career.

Instead, Mormeck had to get through a fight with former EBU champion Mateusz Masternak, which he lost via majority decision. As he had promised before each of his final two fights, he retired following his defeat.

Trivia
Before his first encounter with O'Neil Bell, Mormeck had no nickname, so he asked his fans to come up with one. He did not know that the fans had selected the moniker "The Marksman" until it was announced at the fight.
Mormeck made one appearance in a French television talk-show called "Tout le monde en parle" to raise his mainstream profile.

Professional boxing record

See also

List of cruiserweight boxing champions
List of WBA world champions
List of WBC world champions

References

External links

Jean-Marc Mormeck profile at Cyber Boxing Zone

1972 births
French male boxers
Cruiserweight boxers
World cruiserweight boxing champions
World Boxing Council champions
World Boxing Association champions
Living people
Guadeloupean male boxers
French people of Guadeloupean descent
The Ring (magazine) champions
Chevaliers of the Légion d'honneur